Anchipteraspididae is an extinct family of heterostracan vertebrates restricted to Late Silurian and Early Devonian strata of Arctic Canada.

Anchipteraspidids superficially resemble the ancestral cyathaspidids, but, the articulation and growth patterns of the plates clearly define them as pteraspidids.

References 

 On the recent discovery of Pteraspidian fish in the upper Silurian rocks of North America. Edward Waller Claypole, Quart. Journ. Geol. Soc. 1885, volume 41, pages 48–64, 
 Revised classification of Pteraspididae with description of new forms from Wyoming. Robert Howland Denison,  Fieldiana. Geology ; v. 20, no. 1,

External links 
 

 Commentary of Pteraspidiformes

Pteraspidiformes
Devonian jawless fish
Silurian jawless fish
Early Devonian fish
Prehistoric jawless fish families
Pridoli first appearances
Early Devonian extinctions
Transitional fossils